Uhtna is a small borough in Rakvere Parish, Lääne-Viru County, Estonia. Prior to the 2017 administrative reform of Estonian municipalities, Uhtna was part of Sõmeru Parish. 

The village is bisected by the Kunda river. Uhtna manor and estate, established in 1489, is located in Uhtna.

Gallery

References

Populated places in Lääne-Viru County